Hamptonia is an extinct genus of sea sponge known from the Middle Cambrian Burgess Shale and the Lower Ordovician Fezouata formation.  It was first described in 1920 by Charles Doolittle Walcott. 48 specimens of Hamptonia are known from the Greater Phyllopod bed, where they comprise < 0.1% of the community.

References

External links 
 

Burgess Shale fossils
Protomonaxonida
Burgess Shale sponges
Prehistoric sponge genera
Cambrian genus extinctions
Taxa named by Charles Doolittle Walcott
Fossil taxa described in 1920

Ordovician genus extinctions